"Here I Am" is a song co-written and recorded by Canadian singer Bryan Adams. The song was written and recorded in 2002 for the movie Spirit: Stallion of the Cimarron and was both released on the official soundtrack and as a single. "Here I Am" reached number one in the Czech Republic and Portugal, number five in the United Kingdom and on the US Billboard Adult Contemporary chart, and the top 20 in at least 10 other European countries. The song won an ASCAP Award and was nominated for Golden Globe Award for Best Original Song. Adams also recorded the song in French, called "Me voilà".

Music video

The music video, directed by Mike Lipscombe and produced by Michael J. Pierce, is set in the American Southwest, featuring Adams and several women living in the wilderness trying to survive from thirst, snakes, etc. They are all portrayed as giants roaming on the landscape. As a reference to the movie Spirit: Stallion of the Cimarron, a herd of horses is shown running through a desert.

Bryan Adams' performance and the actor performances were filmed in a green screen studio in Hollywood, California. The background for the video was filmed in Monument Valley, Utah, from a helicopter. The sequences with the horses were filmed at ranch in Santa Clarita, California, against a large green screen so that the action of the horses could be manipulated in post-production. The total production period  was six days, an extremely aggressive turnaround for a project that was all green screen and visual effects. This was necessary to premier the music video at the Hollywood screening of the film Spirit: Stallion of the Cimarron.

Track listing
Maxi-CD
 "Here I Am" (End Title) – 4:46
 "You Can't Take Me" (alternate version) – 3:52
 "Cloud Number Nine" (recorded in Live at Slane Castle, Ireland, August 26, 2000) – 4:06
 "Here I Am" (instrumental) – 4:05

Double CD set version
 "Here I Am (Soundtrack version)
 "Cloud Number 9 (Live From Slane Castle version)
 "I'm Ready (Live At Slane Castle version)
 "Here I Am ((End Title) Fade End)
 "Here I Am (Instrumental version)
 "You Can't Take Me (Alternate version)
 "Here I Am (Video version)

Personnel

Bryan Adams – vocals, acoustic and electric guitar
Mickey Curry – acoustic drum fills
Jimmy Jam and Terry Lewis – keyboards, synths, drum programming
Keith Scott – guitars
Steve Hodge, Kevin Globerman – engineers

Charts

Weekly charts

Year-end charts

Release history

References

2002 singles
2002 songs
A&M Records singles
Bryan Adams songs
Music videos directed by Mike Lipscombe
Number-one singles in the Czech Republic
Number-one singles in Portugal
Song recordings produced by Jimmy Jam and Terry Lewis
Songs written for animated films
Songs written by Bryan Adams
Songs written by Gretchen Peters
Spirit: Stallion of the Cimarron